The 2019 Plateau State gubernatorial election in Nigeria occurred on March 9, 2019. Incumbent APC Governor Simon Lalong won re-election for a second term, defeating PDP Jerry Useni and several minor party candidates.

Simon Lalong emerged APC gubernatorial candidate after he was returned as the sole candidate. He picked Sonni Gwanle Tyoden as his running mate. Jeremiah Useni was the PDP candidate with Ben Shignugul as his running mate. 24 candidates contested in the election.

Electoral system
The Governor of Plateau is elected using the plurality voting system.

Primary election

APC primary
The APC primary election was held on September 30, 2018. Simon Lalong won the primary election after he was returned as the sole candidate. He picked Sonni Gwanle Tyoden as his running mate.

PDP primary
The PDP primary election was held on September 30, 2018. Jerry Useni won the primary election polling 1,018 votes against 12 other candidates. His closest rival was Johnbull Shekarau, who came second with 340 votes. He picked Ben Shignugul as his running mate.

Results
A total number of 24 candidates registered with the Independent National Electoral Commission to contest in the election.

The total number of registered voters in the state was 2,480,455, while 1,157,025 voters were accredited. Total number of votes cast was 1,176,142, while number of valid votes was 1,159,954. Rejected votes were 16,188.

By local government area
Here are the results of the election by local government area for the two major parties. The total valid votes of 1,159,954 represents the 24 political parties that participated in the election. Blue represents LGAs won by Simon Lalong. Green represents LGAs won by Jeremiah Useni.

References 

Plateau State gubernatorial election
Plateau State gubernatorial election
Plateau State gubernatorial elections